Aleksey Nikolaevich Sokirskiy (born March 16, 1985) is a Ukrainian (until 2015) and Russian hammer thrower. His personal best is 76.96, achieved 19 June 2011 in Stockholm. He became a Russian citizen in 2015.

Competition record

References

External links 
 

1985 births
Living people
Naturalised citizens of Russia
People from Horlivka
Russian male hammer throwers
Ukrainian emigrants to Russia
Ukrainian male hammer throwers
Athletes (track and field) at the 2012 Summer Olympics
Olympic athletes of Ukraine
Universiade medalists in athletics (track and field)
Authorised Neutral Athletes at the World Athletics Championships
World Athletics Championships athletes for Ukraine
Universiade bronze medalists for Ukraine
Medalists at the 2009 Summer Universiade
Sportspeople from Donetsk Oblast